The 2014 Albany Great Danes football team represented the University at Albany, SUNY in the 2014 NCAA Division I FCS football season. They were led by Greg Gattuso, who was in his first season as head coach, and played their home games  Bob Ford Field. The Great Danes were members of the Colonial Athletic Association. They finished the season 7–5, 3–5 in CAA play to finish in ninth place.

Schedule

Source: Schedule

Ranking movements

References

Albany
Albany Great Danes football seasons
Albany Great Danes football